David Molony (23 August 1950 – 4 September 2002) was an Irish Fine Gael politician who served as both a Senator and a Teachta Dála (TD).

Born in Thurles, County Tipperary, he was educated in Thurles Christian Brothers' School, Coláiste na Rinne in Waterford, Copsewood College in Limerick, University College Dublin and the Law School of the Incorporated Law Society. He qualified as a lawyer and in the 1970s he worked with the Free Legal Aid Centres (FLAC), a voluntary group providing free legal aid, eventually became the chairman of FLAC.

In 1977 he was elected to the 14th Seanad Éireann on the Cultural and Educational Panel. At the 1981 general election he was returned to the 22nd Dáil as a TD for the Tipperary North constituency, where during the selection of candidates he had beaten future TD and Minister Michael Lowry for the Fine Gael nomination. He was re-elected at the February 1982 and November 1982 general elections. He supported the 1986 referendum to amend the Constitution of Ireland to remove the prohibition on divorce, and was denounced by priests in his constituency.

Molony did not contest the 1987 general election, and retired from political office to continue his law practice and to run his family's business in Thurles. However he remained involved in politics and was a director of elections for local Fine Gael candidates at the 2002 general election.

References

1950 births
2002 deaths
Fine Gael TDs
Members of the 14th Seanad
Members of the 22nd Dáil
Members of the 23rd Dáil
Members of the 24th Dáil
Irish solicitors
People from Thurles
Alumni of University College Dublin
Fine Gael senators